Riccardo Ciervo (born 1 April 2002) is an Italian professional footballer who plays as midfielder or forward for  club Venezia, on loan from Sassuolo.

Career 
In the 2018–19 season, Ciervo scored five goals in 23 appearances with the under-17s of Roma helping his team to finish in the second place. The following year, Ciervo scored three goals in 13 appearances, being also called up for the under-19s for some matches. In the 2020–21 season, he scored three goals in 27 appearances. He also received many calls ups to the senior squad of Roma during the 2020–21 season, particularly for the UEFA Europa League campaign, but did not appear on the field.

On 31 August 2021, he moved from Roma to Sampdoria on loan. On 23 September, he made his debut for Sampdoria (as well as his professional debut) in a 4–0 defeat against Napoli. On 16 December, he debuted as a starter in a second round Coppa Italia 2–1 win against Torino being substituted in the 70th minute.

On 28 January 2022, he moved on loan to Sassuolo with a subsequent obligation to buy.

On 4 July 2022, Ciervo was loaned by Frosinone for the 2022–23 season. On 27 January 2023, he moved on a new loan to Venezia.

Style of play 
Ciervo can play as a left-back, in midfield as a right winger and as a forward.

Career statistics

Club

References

External links 
 

Living people
2002 births
Italian footballers
Association football wingers
Association football forwards
A.S. Roma players
U.C. Sampdoria players
U.S. Sassuolo Calcio players
Frosinone Calcio players
Venezia F.C. players
Serie A players
Serie B players